Tcherepnin may refer to any of the following composers:
 Nikolai Tcherepnin (1873–1945), Russian composer
 Alexander Tcherepnin (1899–1977), Russian composer, son of Nikolai
 Serge Tcherepnin (b. 1941), composer, son of Alexander
 Ivan Tcherepnin (1943–1998), composer, son of Alexander